USS Bailey (DD-492) was a Benson-class destroyer in service with the United States Navy from 1942 to 1946. She was sunk as a target in 1969.

History
She was the third ship named for Admiral Theodorus Bailey. Bailey was launched on 19 December 1941 by Bethlehem Steel Company, Staten Island, New York; sponsored by Mrs. Mary de Peyster Charles, granddaughter of Admiral Bailey, commissioned 11 May 1942 and reported to the Pacific Fleet.

Service history
In the Pacific, Bailey joined TF 8 on patrol in the Aleutian Islands. On 12 January 1943, she supported the unopposed invasion of Amchitka Island and on 26 March took part in the Battle of the Komandorski Islands during which time her captain was LCDR John Atkeson. For this action, she was awarded the Navy Unit Commendation. After undergoing temporary repairs at Dutch Harbor, Alaska, Bailey arrived at Mare Island Navy Yard 8 April 1943 for permanent repairs.

Repairs completed, she arrived at Pearl Harbor 16 October 1943. Between November 1943 and October 1944, Bailey acted as a fire-support, picket, and patrol ship in the invasions of Tarawa (20 November – 7 December 1943); Maloelap and Kwajalein, Marshall Islands (30 January – 29 February 1944); Saipan and Tinian, Marianas Islands (15 June – 28 July); and Peleliu and Angaur, Palau Islands (15 September – 2 October).

On the night of 1 October 1944, she underwent two severe strafing attacks while on picket duty off the Palaus. Damage was extensive, 9 men were killed and 16 wounded. Following emergency repairs Bailey proceeded to Mare Island for permanent repairs, arriving 25 October.

Returning to Pearl Harbor on 24 December 1944, she supported the landings on Mindanao (10 March – 10 April 1945) and on Borneo (27 April – 22 July). Between August and November 1945, she was engaged in training in Far Eastern waters.

On 11 December 1945, she arrived at Boston, Massachusetts for inactivation and went out of commission in reserve at Charleston, South Carolina, 2 May 1946. She was stricken for the Naval Vessel Register on 1 June 1968. She was sunk as a target off Florida on 4 November 1969.

Awards
Bailey received nine battle stars and the Navy Unit Commendation for her service in the Pacific.

References

External links

USS Bailey website at Destroyer History Foundation
USS Bailey DD-492 Website at USS Bailey DD-492

Benson-class destroyers
Ships built in Staten Island
1941 ships
World War II destroyers of the United States
Shipwrecks of the Florida coast
Maritime incidents in 1969
Ships sunk as targets
Ships of the Aleutian Islands campaign